Red vs. Blue: The Shisno Paradox is the sixteenth season of the American action comedy science fiction animated/machinima web series Red vs. Blue first premiered for Rooster Teeth site sponsors on April 15, 2018. Like previous seasons, the series is produced by Rooster Teeth Productions and is loosely based in the Halo universe. This season is the second part of a three-season story arc entitled "The Shisno Paradox".

Synopsis
The plot starts right as Season 15 ended, with the Reds and Blues leaving for lunch. But what would be a simple trip out for pizza ends with them scattered and lost in time, with the soldiers inadvertently becoming pawns in a war between Gods and Titans, which has been raging since before the dawn of time.

Episodes

Cast

Main
 Jason Saldaña as Lavernius Tucker
 Joel Heyman as Michael J. Caboose
 Matt Hullum as Colonel Sarge / Medical Officer Frank DuFresne
 Geoff Ramsey as Captain Dexter Grif
 Gus Sorola as Captain Dick Simmons / Grog / Grog's Wife
 Dan Godwin as Private Franklin Donut
 Burnie Burns as Lopez the Heavy
 Shannon McCormick as Agent Washington
 Jen Brown as Agent Carolina
 Becca Frasier as Kaikaina "Sister" Grif

Recurring
 SungWon Cho as King Atlus Arcadium Rex
 Lydia MacKay as Kalirama the Undying
 Randy E. Aguebor as Burnstorm
 Ricco Fajardo as Genkins
 Ashley Spillers as Huggins
 Jason Stevens as Muggins
 Joe Nicolosi as Jax Jonez
 Koen Wooten as Kohan Wooter
 Jason Weight as Orange Knight (Lancelot)
 Todd Womack as Private George / Maroon Knight (Galahad)

Guests
 Anna Margaret Hollyman as Dylan Andrews
 Arryn Zech as Dr. Emily Grey
 Kerry Shawcross as Lieutenant Charles Palomo
 Barbara Dunkelman as Lieutenant Katie Jensen
 Jeremy Dooley as a local cop
 Lindsay Jones as Aprovos / Kid
 Gray Haddock as Locus

Notes

References

Red vs. Blue
Lists of machinima series episodes